Przysiersk  is a village in the administrative district of Gmina Bukowiec, within Świecie County, Kuyavian-Pomeranian Voivodeship, in north-central Poland.

References

Przysiersk